Zhang Yan (died April or May 163 BC), known formally as Empress Xiaohui (孝惠皇后) was an empress during the Han Dynasty.  She was a daughter of Princess Yuan of Lu (the only daughter of Emperor Gao (Liu Bang) and his wife Empress Lü) and her husband Zhang Ao (張敖, son of Zhang Er), the Prince of Zhao and later Marquess of Xuanping.

Biography

In November 192 BC, at the insistence of then-Empress Dowager Lü, Lady Yan married her uncle Emperor Hui, the son of Emperor Gao and Empress Dowager Lü, and she was created empress.  The marriage was a childless one.  At Empress Dowager Lü's instruction, Empress Zhang took several male children as her own and killed their mothers.  (Whether these children were Emperor Hui's is a matter of controversy, although it appears likely that they were Emperor Hui's children by his concubines.)

When Emperor Hui died in September 188 BC at the age of 22, one of the children that Empress Zhang adopted became emperor (as Emperor Qianshao), but Grand Empress Dowager Lü had effective total control of the imperial government.  Empress Zhang, was not made empress dowager as this title was retained by Empress Dowager Lü who never claimed the title Grand Empress Dowager and did not appear to have significant influence.  Nevertheless, when Emperor Qianshao found out in 184 BC that he was not actually her child, he made a careless comment that he would take vengeance on her—at which Empress Dowager Lü had him deposed and executed, and replaced him with his brother Liu Hong (as Emperor Houshao), who was also adopted by Empress Zhang.  It was during Emperor Qianshao's reign that Empress Zhang's brother Zhang Yan (張偃, pinyin Zhāng Yǎn—notice difference in tone) was created the Prince of Lu.

After Empress Dowager Lü died in August 180 BC, and the Lü clan overthrown and slaughtered by the officials opposed to the Lüs in the Lü Clan Disturbance, Emperor Houshao was deposed and killed.  Empress Zhang was not killed, but she was put under house arrest in a palace to the north after being deposed from her position as empress and henceforth referred to as Empress Hui. Her brother, the Prince of Lu, was also deposed and reduced in rank to Marquess of Nangong. After this no records exist of her later life until her death. Empress Zhang died in 163 BC and was buried with her husband of merely four years.

Family
Father: Zhang Ao, Prince of Zhao and Marquis of Xuanping
Grandfather: Zhang Er, Prince Jin of Zhao
Mother: Princess Yuan of Lu
Grandfather/father-in-law: Emperor Gaozu of Han
Great-grandfather: Liu Taigong
Grandmother/mother-in-law: Empress Lü Zhi
Brother: Zhang Yan, Prince Yuan of Lu and Marquis of Nangong
Brother: Zhang Shou, Marquis of Lechang
Uncle/Husband: Emperor Hui of Han
Adopted son: Emperor Qianshao
Adopted son: Liu Qiang, Prince Huai of Huaiyang
Adopted son: Liu Buyi, Prince Ai of Hengshan
Adopted son: Liu Hong, Emperor Houshao
Adopted son: Liu Zhao, Prince of Hengshan
Adopted son: Liu Wu, Prince of Huaiyang
Adopted son: Liu Tai, Prince of Liang

Titles

 210–192 BC: Princess Zhang Yan of Zhao
 192–188 BC: Empress of China
 188–163 BC: Empress Xiaohui

Notes

References
 

210 BC births
163 BC deaths
Han dynasty empresses
3rd-century BC Chinese women
2nd-century BC Chinese women
3rd-century BC Chinese people
2nd-century BC Chinese people